Douglas Flockhart (born 25 November 1984) is a Scottish professional rugby league and rugby union footballer who played in the 2000s and 2020s.

International honours
Dougie Flockhart won caps for Scotland (RL) while at the Clyde Buccaneers in 2005.

References

External links
Currie 20 Melrose 38
Currie 52-7 Gala
Scotland call up Super League six
Morrison drops out of Scots squad
Borders add De Luca and Flockhart
Brown given key role for Scotland
Ospreys 30-13 Border Reivers
Dragons 48-0 Border Reivers
Border Reivers 16-24 Ospreys
Cornish Pirates 70-10 Esher RFC
Williams set for Cardiff return
Cornish Pirates 7-16 Esher
Championship: Plymouth Albion 3-41 Doncaster Knights

1984 births
Living people
Barbarian F.C. players
Border Reivers players
Currie RFC players
Doncaster R.F.C. players
Esher RFC players
Place of birth missing (living people)
Rugby league centres
Rugby league wingers
Rugby union wings
Scotland 'A' international rugby union players
Scotland national rugby league team players
Scottish rugby league players
Scottish rugby union players
York City Knights players